Mikhaylo Khalilov (born 3 July 1975 in Mykolaiv) is Ukrainian former professional road racing cyclist. He competed in the men's individual road race at the 1996 Summer Olympics.

Major results

1995
 3rd Overall Circuit Franco-Belge
1st Stages 3 & 7
 3rd Circuit de Wallonie
1996
 2nd Road race, National Road Championships
2000
 1st Overall Tour du Faso
1st Points classification
1st Stage 2, 3, 8, 10 & 11
2001
 8th Milano–Torino
 9th Stausee-Rundfahrt Klingnau
2002
 1st Stage 6 Tour of Bulgaria
 2nd Tour du Lac Léman
 2nd Trofeo dell'Etna
2003
 1st Stages 1 & 4 Tour du Sénégal
 3rd Stausee-Rundfahrt Klingnau
 4th Giro del Lago Maggiore
 9th Trofeo dell'Etna
2004
 2nd Giro del Lago Maggiore
 4th Giro del Friuli
 6th Giro delle Colline del Chianti
 9th A Travers le Morbihan
2005
 1st  Road race, National Road Championships
 1st Stage 5 Vuelta a Asturias
 2nd Giro di Toscana
 3rd Overall Tour de Picardie
 3rd Coppa Placci
 6th Paris–Camembert
 9th Route Adélie
2006
 1st  Military World Road Race Championships
 1st Hel van het Mergelland
 6th Overall Tour of Belgium
 8th Gran Premio Bruno Beghelli
2007
 3rd Road race, National Road Championships
 3rd GP Industria & Artigianato di Larciano
 3rd Monte Paschi Eroica
 3rd Coppa Sabatini
 4th Gran Premio Bruno Beghelli
 5th Milano–Torino
 5th GP Industria & Commercio di Prato
 9th Giro del Veneto
2008
 1st Grand Prix de Rennes
 1st Memorial Cimurri
 1st Coppa Sabatini
 1st GP Industria & Commercio di Prato
 2nd Gran Premio Bruno Beghelli
 5th Giro di Toscana
 5th Overall Volta ao Distrito de Santarém
 7th Memorial Viviana Manservisi
 10th Overall Circuit de la Sarthe
1st Stage 4
2009
 4th Memorial Cimurri
2010
 8th Overall Four Days of Dunkirk
 9th Overall Tour de Picardie

References

External links

Ukrainian male cyclists
1975 births
Living people
Sportspeople from Mykolaiv
Olympic cyclists of Ukraine
Cyclists at the 1996 Summer Olympics